Marlow may refer to:

Places

Australia 
Marlow, New South Wales, a suburb on the Central Coast

Germany 
Marlow, Germany

United Kingdom 
Little Marlow, Buckinghamshire
Marlow, Buckinghamshire
Marlow Bridge, an old suspension bridge over the River Thames
Marlow Rugby Union Football Club, a Rugby Union Club in Buckinghamshire
Marlow F.C., a football club in Buckinghamshire
Marlow United F.C., a football club in Buckinghamshire
Marlow Regatta, an international rowing event
 Marlow Town Regatta and Festival, a local rowing event and festival
Marlow, Herefordshire

United States 
Marlow, Missouri
Marlow, New Hampshire
Marlow, Oklahoma
Marlow, Tennessee
Marlow Heights, Maryland

People 
 Marlow (surname), including list of persons and fictional characters with the name

Other uses 
Marlow Industries

See also 
Marlowe (disambiguation)